"I Was Never There" is a song recorded by Canadian singer the Weeknd featuring French DJ Gesaffelstein, taken from Tesfaye's first EP, My Dear Melancholy, released on March 30, 2018. The song was written by the Weeknd, Gesaffelstein, and Frank Dukes, and was produced by the latter two. The song is the first of three collaborations between the two artists and the second of the songs to go viral on TikTok in the early 2020s, after "Lost in the Fire".

Critical reception
The song was met with widespread acclaim, with critics naming it the standout track of its parent EP. The song was ranked the Weeknd's 33rd best song by Rolling Stone due to Gesaffelstein's production and Weeknd's emotional vocal delivery.

Lyrics
The song's lyrics makes references to the Weeknd's previous relationships with model Bella Hadid and singer and actress Selena Gomez.

Commercial performance
The song debuted at number 35 on the US Billboard Hot 100 on the issue dated April 7, 2018. Later on, throughout 2022, "I Was Never There" saw an increase in consumption as the song went viral on the social media platform TikTok alongside several other tracks by the Weeknd, which led to the song entering the Billboard Global 200 chart at 159.

Charts

Weekly charts

Year-end charts

Certifications

References

External links
 

2018 songs
Songs written by Frank Dukes
Songs written by the Weeknd
The Weeknd songs
Gesaffelstein songs
Alternative R&B songs
Song recordings produced by Frank Dukes
Song recordings produced by Gesaffelstein